Attercliffe Chapel, also known as the Hill Top Chapel, is a Gothic chapel in Attercliffe, now a suburb of Sheffield, South Yorkshire, England.  The chapel was constructed in 1629, when Attercliffe was a township separate from Sheffield, although in the same parish. Consecration took place on  St. Matthias' day, 24 February 1630.

By the 1840s, the chapel was used only for funeral services.

The chapel, surrounded by its cemetery, and lying on the south bank of the River Don, was largely rebuilt in 1909, but retains its period atmosphere. It is Grade II listed.

As of 2014, the Sheffield congregation of the Evangelical Presbyterian Church in England and Wales meets at the Chapel.

Famous interments
 Benjamin Huntsman, inventor
 William Staniforth, surgeon

In popular culture
The exterior of the chapel was a location used in the music video for  Cabaret Voltaire's single "Sensoria". The video was directed by Peter Care and released in 1984.

References

Attercliffe
Chapels in England
Churches in Sheffield
English Gothic architecture in South Yorkshire
Grade II listed buildings in Sheffield
Grade II listed churches in South Yorkshire